Allan Kyariga (born January 6, 1994), better known by his stage name Allan Kingdom, is a Canadian rapper and record producer based in Saint Paul, Minnesota. He was a member of Thestand4rd along with Bobby Raps, Corbin, and Psymun. He was featured on Kanye West's single "All Day".

Early life
Allan Kyariga was born in Winnipeg, Manitoba to a South African father and a Tanzanian mother. In his youth, he moved to Wisconsin and eventually to Saint Paul, Minnesota. He studied at Woodbury High School, Creative Arts High School, and Minneapolis Institute of Production and Recording.

Career
In earlier releases, Kyariga used various aliases, including King Kyariga, The Northern Gentleman, and Peanut Butter Prince.

Allan Kingdom's official debut mixtape, Trucker Music, was released in 2011. He was named "Best Hip Hop Artist of 2014" by City Pages. He was listed on Complexs "25 New Rappers to Watch Out For in 2014".

In 2016, he released Northern Lights, which featured guest appearances from Chronixx, Jared Evan, DRAM, and Gloss Gang. In 2017, he released Lines.

Influences
In a 2015 interview with Green Label, Allan Kingdom cited Kid Cudi, Kanye West, and Pharrell Williams as his biggest influences.

Discography

Studio albums
 Thestand4rd (2014) 
 Lines (2017)

Mixtapes
 Trucker Music (2011)
 Talk to Strangers (2013)
 Future Memoirs (2014)
 Northern Lights (2016)

EPs
 Pinkspire Lane (2012)
 Peanut Butter Prince (2018)
 I Don't Do This for Money (2020)

Guest appearances
 Finding Novyon - "Lots" from #TheFoodNetwork (2015)
 Cœur de pirate - "I Don't Want to Break Your Heart" from Roses (2015)
 Jay Prince - "Juice" from Beautiful Mercy (2015)
 Kanye West - "All Day" (2015)
 SolomonDaGod - "ICEGAF" (2015)
 Flume - "You Know" from Skin (2016)
 Jared Evan - "The End Game" from The Blanket Truth (2016)
 No Wyld - "Tomorrow" from Nomads (2016)
 P.O.S - "Sleepdrone/Superposition" from Chill, Dummy (2017)
 Kweku Collins - "Aya" from Grey (2017)
 Finding Novyon - "Tall Hills" from That's My Dawg (2017)
 Nightmares on Wax - "Citizen Kane (Rap Version)" (2017)
 Getter - "Numb" from Visceral (2018)
 SebastiAn - "Yebo" from Thirst (2019)
 1982 - "Does It All Even Matter" from The Quarantine (2020)

References

External links
 
 

1994 births
Living people
Black Canadian musicians
Canadian hip hop record producers
Canadian male rappers
Canadian people of South African descent
Canadian people of Tanzanian descent
21st-century Canadian rappers
Musicians from Winnipeg
21st-century Canadian male musicians